Cunnamulla Airport  is an airport in Cunnamulla, Queensland, Australia.

Airlines and destinations

Services are operated under contract to the Government of Queensland. Previously operated by Skytrans, services have been operated by Regional Express Airlines since 1 January 2015.

See also
 List of airports in Queensland

References

Airports in Queensland
South West Queensland